Kea Farm, at an altitude of 1610 meters (5282 feet) above sea level, is the highest located village in the Cameron Highlands and also peninsular Malaysia, and it is one of the most famous tourist spots in Cameron Highlands. Plenty of stalls selling fresh vegetables, flowers, butterfly farms and self-plucking strawberry farms can be found here. From Kea Farm, there is also the access road to the Sungai Palas Tea Estate and the highest mountain in Cameron Highlands, Gunung Brinchang (2031 m.). The Equatorial Hotel and Nova Highlands Resort and Residence are located here.

External links 
 Cameron-Highland-Destination.com :: More info about Kea Farm
 Equatorial Hotel
BOH Tea Plantation

 

Cameron Highlands
Villages in Pahang